Thierry Zomahoun, born in Benin, West Africa, is a Benin-Canadian national. He is a political economist, an industry leader, a grand strategist and a global thought leader for innovative education initiatives. A former Board Director of the Canadian Council for International Corporation (CCIC), Zomahoun is currently the Chairman and CEO of The Niagara Forum (http://niagaraforum.ca), Canada’s global premier forum on geopolitics, science and innovation. The Niagara Forum is an international platform established to host highly strategic initiatives including a global gathering called global agora, a world leaders forum and a youth leadership lab. (http://niagaraforum.ca). As Chairman and CEO, he oversees a consortium of strategic initiatives including a think tank on geopolitics and five research chair programs (geomatics, biodiversity, finance, technology and entrepreneurship). Zomahoun is the Chairman and CEO of SPG Inc., an international high tech firm headquartered in Toronto (Canada). In 2013, He founded the Next Einstein Forum (NEF). The NEF is a global premier and pioneer forum on science and innovation in Africa. The first NEF edition (2016) took place in Senegal under the auspices of HE President Macky Sall. He successfully led the organization of the NEF second edition (2018) in Rwanda under the leadership of HE President Paul Kagame. In 2019, he founded The Kifra Prize to reward research excellence and breakthrough discoveries. In 2019, Zomahoun was named by The New African Magazine as one of the top 100 Most Influential Africans. In 2011, he joined the African Institute for Mathematical Sciences (AIMS) as the first President and CEO. He successfully led the institution from 2011 through to early 2020. He designed and spearheaded the growth of AIMS into a pan-African and an internationally acclaimed knowledge and math and science ecosystem of centres of excellence across multiple countries.

Innovative education advocacy 

During his leadership at AIMS, he focused on developing and expanding a network of campuses for graduate scholarship and research in Mathematical Sciences. Saved from the streets by his grandmother, he learned the value of education at a young age and achieved graduate degrees from universities in Africa, Europe and North America. Since 2011, his work has focused on creating an enabling environment for the transformation of Africa through education.

Fluent in French and English, Zomahoun is a public advocate for altering perceptions about the potential of African youth and changing attitudes about Africa's role as a global hub for science. He told Jeffrey Marlow from Wired (website) at Falling Walls 2014 in Berlin that AIMS graduates are prepared to challenge the status quo. Through formal Masters programs, applied research and science school teacher training programs, the academic institutes produce scholars versed in critical thinking, independent reasoning and problem solving. His objective is to form a generation of young scientists and leaders to develop the continent using innovation and change the image of Africa to a continent where science is embraced.

During a meeting with parliamentarians in Ottawa, Canada in October 2014, Zomahoun told Carl Bernier in a Radio Canada interview, "With a new generation of young scientists we want to transform the image of Africa." What is different about Zomahoun's approach is that his researchers' topics are directly aligned to development issues. "We are creating young leaders in health sciences, technology, finance and other disciplines from the investment of partners like the Canadian government, he said. "Investment from them has been key to the success of our centres in South Africa, Ghana, Senegal, Cameroon and Tanzania."

Zomahoun underlines the importance of arming graduates with employment skills as well. "Our plan is to close the skills gap in Africa, we want to train our scholars to take leadership roles in health sciences, planning, technology, telecommunications and banking," he told Anasthasie Tudieshe of Radio France International. This, Zomahoun believes, is important for youth career advancement and promotes employability.

With the goal of encouraging more youth to pursue science, Zomahoun told Luca Tancredi Barone from EuroScientist (Euroscience) in 2015 that, “With 80 per cent of African scholars pursuing humanities, his plan is to accelerate training for scientists in mathematics.” He believes that Mathematical Sciences provides the greatest benefit for Africa because the investment in infrastructure remains low. Zomahoun also noted with African projects such as the M-Pesa in Kenya and the Square Kilometre Array in South Africa, the continent will need more scientists like the ones trained at AIMS to ensure the programs succeed.

He also advocates for young women to pursue mathematical sciences. Zomahoun asserts that, “Women and youth must participate in change and development in Africa. “The next Einstein will be African and her education in science will be the basis for the development of the continent,” he said when interviewed by Aliou Kande of Le Monde.

Career, industry and initiatives 

In 2013, Zomahoun founded the Next Einstein Forum (NEF), a global forum for science and technology, the first to take place on African soil, with the aim of making Africa a global centre for science discourse. The first NEF Global Gathering will take place in Dakar (Senegal) in March 2016.

Zomahoun joined AIMS in 2011. His academic team recruit the brightest post-graduate mathematics and science students in Africa and give them the opportunity to study with professors from international universities, in a 24-hour, tuition-free environment. The model proved effective in South Africa and when Zomahoun joined his mission was to replicate it across the continent. The expansion plan came to be known as the Next Einstein Initiative. Zomahoun’s focus is to ensure the institutes offer research and training opportunities that meet the highest international standards. “We must create the right environment for African scientists to thrive and remain at home to do their research and innovate,” Zomahoun told Philippa Thomas on BBC Four’s The World Tonight in 2014.

Zomahoun was invited to join the delegation of Canada's Prime Minister Stephen Harper to the Summit of the Organization of La Francophonie in Dakar, Senegal in 2014. He told Senegal’s Le Soleil, “With our partners, such as the Canadian Government, we ensure that they invest in science, research and mathematics to transform Africa through a socio-economic and technological development plan.”

In June 2015, Zomahoun secured a $25 million (USD) investment from the MasterCard Foundation enabling 500 scholarship students to pursue master's degrees in mathematical sciences and developing a mathematics teacher training program. The donation was announced in Cape Town on June 4, 2015.

Previously, Zomahoun has worked for Right to Play International, Aide et Action International, and ChildFund International. Zomahoun believes that science must focus on impact and be useful to society. On a panel at the World Economic Forum 2015, Zomahoun debated that sciences and mathematics can be harnessed to offer relevant solutions for global problems. AIMS has a student body that encompasses 42 African nationalities and attracts 150 to 200 instructors from 35 countries from around the globe each year.

Education, awards and memberships

Zomahoun holds an MBA from HEC Montréal and McGill University Desautels School of Management. He has a DEA [Diplôme d’Etudes Approfondies] and a Postgraduate Diploma in development studies from the Graduate Institute of International and Development Studies (Switzerland). He earned another master's degree and a Bachelors Degree from the National University of Benin.[1] 

Zomahoun has pursued his PhD in Political Science at the University of Guelph, Canada. He completed the coursework of his doctoral studies, but he had to put his fields research work on hold because of his heavy professional work load that spans several continent and multiple countries. While at the University of Guelph, Zomahoun was a teaching assistant in political economy with responsibility for Bachelors degree level students.

Zomahoun received several awards and was a member of several professional associations among which:

Bamako Forum Innovation Award (2020), NewAfrican Magazine Top 100 Most Influential Africans (2020), Development Leaders Award (2018),  Stanford Who's Who Award (2010), Member, UK Trade Investment Task Force on Africa (2011-2013),Board Director, Canadian Council for International Corporation CCIC (2008-2010), Canadian Society of Associations Executives (2008-2010), Canadian Association of International Development Consultants (2008-2010).

References

External links
 www.nexteinstein.org
 www.nef.org
 www.niagaraforum.ca.

Year of birth missing (living people)
Living people
Beninese academic administrators
Beninese expatriates in South Africa
McGill University Faculty of Management alumni
University of Geneva alumni
Graduate Institute of International and Development Studies alumni